Zina Garrison and Sherwood Stewart were the defending champions but lost in the first round to Louise Field and Brad Drewett.

Jana Novotná and Jim Pugh won in the final 5–7, 6–2, 6–4 against Martina Navratilova and Tim Gullikson.

Seeds
Champion seeds are indicated in bold text while text in italics indicates the round in which those seeds were eliminated.

Draw

Final

Top half

Bottom half

References
 1988 Australian Open – Doubles draws and results at the International Tennis Federation

Mixed Doubles
Australian Open (tennis) by year – Mixed doubles